2-Bromo-LSD, also known as BOL-148, is a derivative of lysergic acid invented by Albert Hofmann, as part of the original research from which the closely related compound LSD was also derived. 2-Bromo-LSD was found to be inactive as a psychedelic and so was comparatively little researched for many years, although its similar behavior in the body made it useful for radiolabelling studies. It was found to bind to many of the same receptors as LSD, but acting as a neutral antagonist rather than an agonist. However its generally similar behavior to LSD in some respects has shown to be very useful in one specific area, the treatment of cluster headaches. These debilitating attacks have been known for some time to be amenable to treatment with certain hallucinogenic drugs such as LSD and psilocybin, but because of the illegal status of these drugs and the kind of mental changes they induce, research into their medical use has been slow and therapeutic application limited to very specific circumstances under strict supervision. It had been thought that this specific therapeutic action against cluster headaches was limited to hallucinogenic drugs of this type, and would always present a major barrier to their clinical use. However, a serendipitous discovery found that 2-bromo-LSD can also produce this therapeutic effect, despite lacking the other effects of LSD. This has led to a resurgence of interest and research into 2-bromo-LSD and its possible medical uses. Some isolated incidents of hallucinogenic responses have been reported, but as with other non-hallucinogenic LSD analogs such as lisuride, this appears to be a rare side effect occurring only in individuals with an as yet unexplained susceptibility to this reaction. 2-Bromo-LSD reportedly attenuates the effects of LSD in humans.

References

Antimigraine drugs
Lysergamides
Serotonin receptor antagonists
Bromoarenes
Diethylamino compounds